Canarionesticus is a monotypic genus of spiders in the family Nesticidae. It was first described in 1992 by Wunderlich. Its sole species is Canarionesticus quadridentatus, found in the Canary Islands.

References

Nesticidae
Monotypic Araneomorphae genera
Spiders of the Canary Islands